Bag It may refer to:

 Bag It: Is Your Life Too Plastic?, a 2010 documentary film
 "Bag It", a song by Canadian musician Peaches on her album Fatherfucker